Disappeared is an American documentary television show on Investigation Discovery that debuted on December 10, 2009. The show contains re-enactments and interviews with law enforcement officers, investigators, and relatives connected with cases in which individuals have gone missing. Each episode focuses on a single case of either one individual, or sometimes several individuals who disappeared together.

The show's initial run was composed of six seasons that originally aired between December 2009 to April 2013. Following a three-year-long hiatus, on April 11, 2016, the show resumed on the Investigation Discovery network, debuting its seventh season. In 2021, the show was returned as a podcast. In May 2022, it was announced that the show was being rebooted for the 2022-2023 television season.  The tenth season premiered September 7, 2022.

Format
Disappeared follows a documentary format. It features re-enactments and interviews with family members, friends, and law enforcement connected to the missing subject(s), to explore their recent lives and last actions prior to disappearing. By the time episodes air, some cases had been resolved, with a variety of outcomes, but most often the cases covered have not been explained at the time the episode reaches broadcast.

Broadcast history
The series debuted on December 10, 2009, featuring the case of Brandi Ellen Wells. After the series' sixth season conclusion in 2013, it was on a three-years-long hiatus. On April 11, 2016, the series returned to Investigation Discovery for a seventh season. The program was renewed for an eighth season, which premiered March 26, 2017. The ninth season premiered March 16, 2018. After its cancellation in 2018, the show was rebooted in 2022 for a tenth season after the success of its spin-off podcast.

Episodes

See also
List of people who disappeared mysteriously

Notes

References

External links
 Disappeared on Facebook
 

2000s American crime television series
2000s American mystery television series
2009 American television series debuts
2010s American crime television series
2010s American mystery television series
2020s American crime television series
2020s American mystery television series
English-language television shows
American non-fiction television series
Investigation Discovery original programming
Television series about missing people
Television series featuring reenactments
Works about unsolved crimes
American television series revived after cancellation
Audio podcasts
Crime podcasts
2021 podcast debuts